David Frank Hamilton (born May 5, 1957) is a Senior United States circuit judge of the United States Court of Appeals for the Seventh Circuit. He was previously a United States district judge of the United States District Court for the Southern District of Indiana. On March 17, 2009, he became President Barack Obama's first judicial nominee when he was named for a seat on the Seventh Circuit. He was confirmed by the Senate on November 19, 2009, in a 59–39 vote.

Early life, education, and career
Born in Bloomington, Indiana, Hamilton grew up in southern Indiana and earned a Bachelor of Arts degree from Haverford College in 1979, followed by a Juris Doctor from Yale Law School in 1983. He also performed graduate work as a Fulbright Scholar at the University of Tübingen in Germany.

Hamilton worked from 1983 until 1984 as a law clerk for Judge Richard Dickson Cudahy of the United States Court of Appeals for the Seventh Circuit. He then entered private practice in Indianapolis until 1989 as an associate at the law firm of Barnes & Thornburg. He served as Legal Counsel to Indiana Governor Evan Bayh from 1989 until 1991. Hamilton returned to Barnes & Thornburg in Indianapolis, working as a partner from 1991 until becoming a federal judge in 1994. During his time in private practice, Hamilton frequently did pro bono work for the Indiana Civil Liberties Union, where he served briefly as a board member and Vice President for Litigation.

Federal judicial service

District court service 
President Bill Clinton nominated Hamilton to be a United States district judge of the United States District Court for the Southern District of Indiana on June 8, 1994. The Senate confirmed Hamilton by a voice vote on October 7, 1994. He received his commission on October 11, 1994. Hamilton was the chief judge of the Southern District of Indiana from January 1, 2008 to November 24, 2009. His service as a district court judge was terminated on November 24, 2009 when he was elevated to the United States Court of Appeals for the Seventh Circuit.

A number of cases Hamilton decided as a district court judge drew media attention. In American Amusement Mach. Ass'n v. Cottey, Hamilton held that the First Amendment did not prevent the city of Indianapolis from requiring parental consent for children to have access to video games containing explicit sexual content or extreme violence. This ruling was overturned by the Seventh Circuit.

Hamilton drew headlines in 2005 for ruling that the Indiana state legislature violated the Establishment Clause when it began sessions with Christian prayers imploring conversion to Christianity or representing Christianity as the only true faith. He held that prayers invoking Jesus Christ or using terms like savior were sectarian, but names for God in other languages were permissible, absent evidence that those words were used in order to advance or disparage a particular religion. The ruling was overturned by the Seventh Circuit on the ground that the taxpayer plaintiffs lacked standing.

Court of appeals service 
On March 17, 2009, President Barack Obama announced his intention to nominate Hamilton to a vacancy on the Seventh Circuit that was created by Judge Kenneth Francis Ripple, who assumed senior status in September 2008. Obama formally nominated Hamilton later that day. He became President Barack Obama's first judicial nominee when he was named for a seat on the Seventh Circuit. On November 17, 2009, the Senate voted 70–29 to invoke cloture on his nomination. On November 19, 2009, the Senate confirmed Hamilton's nomination by a 59–39 vote. He received his commission on November 23, 2009. On December 1, 2021, he announced his intent to assume senior status upon confirmation of a successor. He assumed senior status on December 5, 2022.

Notable opinions 
In March 2017, Hamilton partially dissented when the circuit found that police officers could not be sued for needlessly destroying property during a search because they had prevented the owner from witnessing which officers had caused the damage and that the owner had not pled a novel “conspiracy of silence” claim.

In December 2017, Hamilton authored the majority opinion in Dassey v. Dittmann, which denied Brendan Dassey's habeas corpus petition to have his murder conviction thrown out because, his lawyers argued, it was based on a coerced false confession. Dassey's confession had become the source of national outrage when portions of it were aired in the Netflix miniseries Making a Murderer. Brendan Dassey was sixteen at the time of the confession, and had an IQ of approximately 80. Despite noting the numerous inconsistencies and troubling procedural problems with the confession, Hamilton, along with three Conservative judges on the 7th Circuit en banc appeals court, decided that the confession was a viable piece of evidence and that Dassey's murder conviction should stand.

On August 27, 2019, Hamilton wrote the majority opinion in blocking Indiana's parental notification requirement. Hamilton was joined by Ilana Rovner, over the dissent of Michael Stephen Kanne. On November 1, 2019, the seventh circuit denied rehearing by a vote of 6–5, with Hamilton in the majority, however Frank Easterbrook, who provided the decisive vote, called on the Supreme Court to hear the case. 

On August 29, 2019, Hamilton was one of 3 judges that upheld Illinois' assault weapon ban.

On February 24, 2020, Hamilton authored the majority opinion in Viamedia v. Comcast, a case dealing with a contentious doctrine in American antitrust law known as refusal to deal. Although the opinion was not based on a trial and only allowed Viamedia to proceed with its monopolization claims against Comcast, some antitrust scholars believe the case could "breathe life" into refusal to deal claims, which have generally lost favor following the Supreme Court's decision in Verizon Communications Inc. v. Law Offices of Curtis V. Trinko, LLP.

On December 17, 2021, Hamilton dissented in a 7-3 decision that ruled that a police officer who stopped a car because it was following another car too closely and then searched the car for drugs did not violate the 4th amendment. Hamilton showed concern that the 7th circuit's ruling could allow a police officer to detain someone at a basic traffic stop until the officer is satisfied.

Family
Hamilton's brother, John Hamilton, has served as  the mayor of Bloomington, Indiana since 2016 He is married to Dawn Johnsen, whose nomination to serve as assistant attorney general for the Office of Legal Counsel in the United States Department of Justice was blocked by the Senate. His father, Richard "Dick" Hamilton is a retired United Methodist minister who served the North United Methodist Church in Indianapolis for many years. Hamilton is a nephew of former Congressman Lee H. Hamilton.

See also
Barack Obama judicial appointment controversies
Boika v. Holder

References

External links

Recent opinions by Chief Judge David F. Hamilton, from the United States District Court, Southern District of Indiana
David Hamilton at the Alliance for Justice

1957 births
Living people
20th-century American judges
20th-century American lawyers
21st-century American judges
Haverford College alumni
Indiana lawyers
Judges of the United States Court of Appeals for the Seventh Circuit
Judges of the United States District Court for the Southern District of Indiana
People from Bloomington, Indiana
United States court of appeals judges appointed by Barack Obama
United States district court judges appointed by Bill Clinton
Yale Law School alumni
Fulbright alumni